The Titlis Cliff Walk is a pedestrian bridge along the cliff of Mount Titlis in the Swiss Alps. It broke the record held by Salbit Bridge, also located in Switzerland.

The project was designed as a celebration of the 100th anniversary of the opening of the Engelberg–Gerschnialp funicular railway in January 1913. It was officially opened on 7 December 2012 during a snow storm, leaving dignitaries from 15 countries unable to see more than just a few metres; the public opening occurred a day later.

Constructed over a period of five months, the bridge was built when weather conditions permitted. Much of the material used in construction was transported on cable cars, with larger sections being delivered by helicopter.

At a cost of around £1 million, it is hoped that the bridge will become a significant tourist attraction, particularly during the warmer months. In the first two weeks of it being opened, around 500 visitors crossed the bridge. Media reports called it the "world's scariest bridge" and Switzerland Tourism called it "a high-adrenaline kind of new adventure". The ski resort spokesman claims that the bridge is "100 percent safe" and explains that it is "really impossible to fall from the bridge".

See also
Peak Walk

References

External links
Official site (Titlis.ch)

Bridges in Switzerland
Engelberg
Bern–Obwalden border
Tourist attractions in Switzerland
Bridges completed in 2012
21st-century architecture in Switzerland